Arcadia Olenska-Petryshyn (June 19, 1934 – May 6, 1996) was a Ukrainian-born American artist, art critic and editor.

She was born Arcadia Olenska in Roznoshyntsi, Ukraine. She left Ukraine with her family in 1944, moving to Augsburg in Germany. Five years later, they moved to the United States, settling in New York City. She was educated at Washington Irving High School and went on to earn a MA at Hunter College, later doing post-graduate work at the University of Chicago. She married Volodymyr Petryshyn, a mathematics professor, in 1956.

She worked mainly with lithographs and oil paint. She exhibited her work at shows in New York City, Toronto, Brussels, Shenyang, Kyiv and Lviv. She was an active member of the "New York Group", an association of Ukrainian artists and writers, and helped create the Association of Young Ukrainian Artists. 

Olenska-Petryshyn was art editor for Suchasnist', a Ukrainian literary and cultural journal.

In 1996, she was murdered by her husband at home in North Brunswick, New Jersey following an argument. Her husband was later found not guilty by reason of insanity.

Her work is held in various public and private collections, including the Ukrainian Museum in New York City. and the New Jersey State Museum.

References 

1934 births
1996 deaths
Ukrainian women artists
Ukrainian SSR emigrants to the United States
People murdered in New Jersey
Hunter College alumni
University of Chicago alumni
Ukrainian art critics
People from North Brunswick, New Jersey